Razan (also Romanized as Razān; also known as Razak) is a village in Chuqur Rural District, Tarom Sofla District, Qazvin County, Qazvin Province, Iran. At the 2006 census, its population was 71, in 13 families.

References 

Populated places in Qazvin County